The Trio Ceresio is an internationally renowned Swiss classical music piano trio founded in Lugano, Switzerland, which has performed worldwide much of the piano trio repertoire.

Its current members are:

 Anthony Flint, violin
 Johann Sebastian Paetsch, cello
 Sylviane Deferne, piano

History
Three internationally renowned artists who share the same passion decided to bring their music to audiences throughout the world. Anthony Flint violinist and cellist Johann Sebastian Paetsch, conceived the idea of the Trio Ceresio in their homes on the shores of Lake Lugano, which is known locally as Ceresio. The pianist Sylviane Deferne, who also shares the desire to explore the piano trio repertoire. The union of these three artists and with their combined artistic qualities has ensured the group instant success from the promoters and their audience since their first performance.

Performances

The concerts held in Italy, the Summer Festival of Verona, Cremona and Switzerland to Schubertiade Festival of Freiburg and in Switzerland, have all had a great success. After another successful series of concerts held in Lugano, the Trio Ceresio were asked to record the compositions for piano trio from the composers Beethoven and Arensky for Radio Svizzera Italiana.

A recent Swiss television production featured the works of Shostakovich and Dvorak. This season, the Trio Ceresio performed with great success the Beethoven Triple Concerto with the Orchestra of Gunma in Japan. In 2009 a series of concerts was devoted entirely to Mendelssohn.

The Trio Ceresio has had a significant impact on the public, offering an unforgettable listening experience wherever it plays.

References
Trio Ceresio website

External links
 http://www.trioceresio.org

Swiss musical groups
Swiss classical musicians
Piano trios
Chamber music groups
Classical music trios